ECWA Hospital Egbe is a Christian hospital located in Egbe, Kogi State, Nigeria. 
It is a 121-bed hospital which became SIM's first training hospital.

Background 
There was missionary activity in Egbe so many years ago particularly through Rev. Tommy Titcombe and his wife (a British-born Canadian Missionary), on behalf of the Serving In Mission (SIM) from the United States, Canada, and the UK,  who served in Egbe and Yagba land from 1908 for more than a decade, this has left a positive impact on the people of Egbe, Yagba and Nigeria at large. He came to Egbe at a time when West Africa was considered a white man's grave due to the existence of malaria. 'Oyinbo' Egbe as Rev Titcombe was fondly called was used by God to start a large and healthy church in Yagba land that continues until this day. He was also renowned for caring for the sick, especially those with ulcerous wounds. ECWA Hospital Egbe became one of the products of the work.

History 
Tommy Titcombe, while preaching from place to place usually saw people with sores; this encouraged him to embark on health care services, while he was quick to notice this as another avenue to winning souls. Formation of ECWA Hospital Egbe gradually began.

Tommy Titcombe married Ethel McIntosh in 1915; this union brought about a turning point in the history of the hospital. Tommy and wife arrived Egbe two days before Christmas 1915 from their honey moon, they didn't realise how exciting Christmas Day was going to be. As they were getting ready to go to the five O’clock service on Christmas morning, a messenger came running from the town beckoning Ethel to come quickly. There was a woman who had just giving birth to twins. She had had four babies and all had died. At that time Yagbas (this is what people from Egbe and surrounding communities are called) believed that a woman who gave birth to twins was something less than human and they wouldn't let them live in the village any longer. Believing one of the twins must be an evil spirit, so, they were waiting for the medicine man to come and kill both of them. Consequently, Ethel (Tommy's wife) was able to save the twins and the woman from being put to death, though there was resistance from the people, but for God's intervention. The first twins (Reuben and Ruth) were saved on that day without any evil befalling them as the people believed and the practice was gradually abolished from among the Yagba people.    
Perhaps, because Ethel wanted to save more twins, she decided to start a small maternity in their house. This was the genesis of ECWA Hospital Egbe. In 1925 they started building a Maternity and Clinic, with Christian converts’ support and hard labour, the building was completed in 1926.

Since the birth of the hospital, Rev and Mrs. Titcombe had worked hard to sustain it till 1951. It must be tough for them since both of them do not have a formal medical training; they developed the nursing skill with time. By 1950, Egbe people had started to develop and manifest a very positive response to the medical services. No doubt there was increased patronage from both within and outside Egbe, consequently Rev and Mrs. Titcombe could no longer cope with the increasing number of patients even with the helping hand of Olutoju who was a trained Nurse, hence there was an immediate need for trained personnel. Meanwhile, Rev Tommy Titcombe had consulted with Dr. George Campion in 1949; Dr. Campion was in his final year of medical training at Canada. He agreed to come to Egbe after his course. Tommy and Ethel's decision to return home was a ‘sad news’ for Egbe people, but since Tommy was getting old, and must have felt a growing sense of peace within himself saying "now I have more time to pray for Egbe Hospital and SIM Missionaries". Tommy officially retired home in his 77th years in 1958.

The arrival of Dr. Campion and his wife who decided to go back into nursing after her degree course (B. A. Honours in English Language) marked the peak of the final transition of the hospital to one of the biggest, most popular and most successful hospital in the present Kogi State and Nigeria at large. Because of the medical inconvenience posed on him by lack of necessary buildings, he immediately initiated the construction of certain buildings which include: the main building housing; Autoclave room, operation theatre, Doctor's offices, Outpatients Department (OPD), Patients’ waiting room, card room, Ward A and the Laboratory. These buildings were completed and dedicated on 17 July 1953.  By January 1954, the 25-bed added Ward A (called Dr. Schoffstall ward) could no more accommodate the ever-increasing number of patients.
The rate of growth and fame of the hospital became unprecedented, so by 1962, the available ward A (Schoffstall ward) and ward B (Hope Sneath ward) became inadequate, thus a third ward C (Gay Hawtin Ward) was started and completed with 19 beds. The hospital could boast of 69 bedded wards.

In 1965, Campion added some pressing building needed which include: Central Supply Room, Administration, Pharmacy, cashiers and Accounts with second floor operating suite completed. Further more, because of the 520 births received in 1970 alone, the new maternity was equipped with 35 beds.

Because of the need to reflect the image of the hospital as a mission aimed and for evangelism purpose, Dr. Campion initiated the building of three Pastor's Offices in 1971, the building was dedicated to the memory of Dr. Janet Troupe who died in Nigeria while treating Lassa fever patients. In fact, the programme was designed that all the patients had to pass through one pastor or the other. Dr. and Mrs George Campion returned home in 1986.

ECWA School of Nursing and ECWA School of Midwifery 
Dr. Campion soon realised the fact that very soon more hands will be needed in order to carry on with the work; he took the first paramedical initiatives to establish a Nursing Training School (NTS)(now ECWA School of Nursing, Egbe) which will produce nurses that will be engaged in the medical service of the hospital. Although, the school was established in 1955, the government's approval was not secured until 1957. ECWA Nursing Training School was the first of its kind in the whole Kogi and Kwara for many years. ECWA School of Midwifery, Egbe was first established in 1977 as Midwives Training School and since has been graduating midwives who practice in Nigeria and abroad.

Departments 
	Administration
	Account
	Pharmacy
	Operating Room (Theatre Unit)
	Radiology (X-ray)
	Outpatient Department
	Laboratory
	Ward A (Female Medical Ward)
	Ward C (Children Ward)
	Male Surgery Ward
	Maternity
	Under fives’ Clinic, Antenatal and Family Planning Clinic
	Eye Centre
	Maintenance
	Evangelism
	HIV/AIDS Counselling Clinic

Egbe Hospital Revitalization Project 
http://vimeo.com/35716342

References

 http://www.titcombecollege.com//index.php?option=com_content&task=view&id=12&Itemid=27
 http://www.sim.org
 http://www.egbeorunmila-ayalamopin.com Followers of Ifa Traditions
 ECWA Hospital Egbe: A citadel of Blessings
 Tread Upon the  Lion
 https://web.archive.org/web/20100605190306/http://www.egbehospital.org/egbe_hospital_departments.asp

Hospital buildings completed in 1926
Hospitals in Nigeria
Christian hospitals
Hospitals established in 1926
20th-century architecture in Nigeria